Albert Lajuane Burditt (born May 15, 1972) is an American retired basketball player. He played for four years at the University of Texas at Austin, before being drafted by the Houston Rockets in the 1994 NBA draft. However, he did not play in the NBA.  Burditt played for the Oklahoma City Cavalry of the Continental Basketball Association in the 1994–1995 season, averaging 8.4 points and 8.1 rebounds per game. Burditt played professionally in the CBA and nine other countries.

References

Profile  —  TheDraftReview.com

External links
Latinbasket.net profile
 Spanish league stats

1972 births
Living people
American expatriate basketball people in Argentina
American expatriate basketball people in Italy
American expatriate basketball people in Mexico
American expatriate basketball people in Portugal
American expatriate basketball people in Spain
American expatriate basketball people in Sweden
American expatriate basketball people in Uruguay
American men's basketball players
Andrea Costa Imola players
Basketball players from Austin, Texas
Belgrano de San Nicolás basketball players
CB Gran Canaria players
Houston Rockets draft picks
Liga ACB players
Oklahoma City Cavalry players
Pallacanestro Reggiana players
Pallacanestro Varese players
Power forwards (basketball)
Roseto Sharks players
S.L. Benfica basketball players
Santeros de Aguada basketball players
Texas Longhorns men's basketball players